Justus and Pastor (died  304), venerated as Christian martyrs, were two schoolboy brothers (Justus was 13 years old, Pastor less than 9) who were killed for their faith during the Diocletian persecutions. The boys are today considered the patron saints of Alcalá. They are mentioned by Prudentius.

Martyrdom
After the imperial proclamation was made public in Complutum, Justus and Pastor, were at school. Stimulated by their desire to give their lives for Jesus Christ, they chucked the tablets they used for writing and ran to Dacianus’ residence to bear witness of their faith to the point of martyrdom, despite their young age. They confessed to Dacianus that they were Christians and were reluctant to sacrifice to idols. He tried to win them over with gifts, but he was unable to persuade them. They were viciously flogged for denouncing the Roman religion and later beheaded outside the Spanish city of Alcalá de Henares (known in Roman times as Complutum).

Veneration
Relics believed to be those of Justus and Pastor were discovered in the 8th century and taken to Huesca. In 1568, they were brought back to Alcalá de Henares and interred beneath the high altar of the city's Cathedral-Magistral of Saints Justus and Pastor (known familiarly as the Catedral de los Santos Niños). Constructed between 1497 and 1514,the ancient cathedral is still in daily use, and the saints' tomb is accessible to the public.

The Basilica of Saints Justus and Pastor in Barcelona was erected in the 16th century in the Gothic style.

Narbonne Cathedral located in the town of Narbonne in southern France is also dedicated to Justus and Pastor.

In popular culture
The story of Justus and Pastor is mentioned in the 2001 film The Others, where it is read by Nicholas (James Bentley), with his sister Anne (Alakina Mann) sitting nearby, under the supervision of their mother Grace Stewart (Nicole Kidman). The children find the story amusing, where Anne criticises Justus and Pastor as being "really stupid" for facing a gruesome martyrdom, when they could have lied to spare their lives. She tells her mother (Kidman), "Inside I would have believed in Him, but I wouldn’t have told the Romans that."

See also
Woman with seven sons

References

External links 

Saints of August 6

3rd-century births
304 deaths
Christian child saints
Saints from Hispania
Saints duos
4th-century Christian martyrs
4th-century Romans
Spanish children
Groups of Christian martyrs of the Roman era
Executed children